Catley is a suburb of Peterborough, UK and a surname. Notable people with the surname include:

Ann Catley (1745–1789), English singer and actress
Bob Catley (born 1947), English singer and musician
Bob Catley (politician) (born 1942), Australian Labor politician
Christine Cole Catley (1922– 2011), New Zealand journalist, publisher and author.
Elaine M. Catley (1889-1984), Canadian poet
Glenn Catley (born 1972), British retired professional boxer
Gwen Catley (1906–1996), English coloratura soprano
Has Catley (1915–1975), New Zealand rugby union player
Matthew Catley (born 1975), English cricketer
Russell Catley (1973–2020), English cricketer
Steph Catley (born 1994), Australian football
Timothy Catley (born 1977), English cricketer
Yasmin Catley, Australian politician